Jason Chang (born May 25, 1982) is a Hong Kong curler. He has competed at the 2016 Pacific-Asia Curling Championships where he finished with a 3-5 record, at the 2017 Pacific-Asia Curling Championships where he finished with a 1-7 record, and at the 2018 Pacific-Asia Curling Championships where he finished with a 3-5 record.

Chang has twice competed at the World Mixed Doubles Curling Championship with partner Ling-Yue Hung. The pair finished 27th at the 2018 World Mixed Doubles Curling Championship and 38th at the 2019 World Mixed Doubles Curling Championship.

He has competed three times at the World Mixed Curling Championship.

Teammates

References

External links

1982 births
Living people
Hong Kong male curlers
21st-century Hong Kong people